The Very Best of Roberta Flack is a greatest hits album from Roberta Flack, spanning songs from her entire career, and released on Rhino Records in 2006. In his review of the album, Rob Theakston of Allmusic says it "is easily the best retrospective of her work available to date."

Track listing

References 

Roberta Flack albums
2006 greatest hits albums
Rhino Records compilation albums